Events in the year 1998 in Hong Kong.

Incumbents
 Chief Executive: Tung Chee-hwa

Events
 25 January - Miss Chinese International Pageant 1998
 2 February - All ferry routes from Jordan Road Ferry Pier were open.
 26 April - 17th Hong Kong Film Awards
 24 May - The 1998 Hong Kong legislative election were held for electing the 1st Legislative Council of Hong Kong
 6 July - The Kai Tak Airport, which was the international airport of Hong Kong since 1954 was closed
.

See also
 List of Hong Kong films of 1982

References

Links

 
Years of the 20th century in Hong Kong
Hong Kong
Hong Kong